Cornelius Murphy (born 1965) is an Irish former Gaelic footballer who played for the Dr. Crokes club and at inter-county level with the Kerry senior football team.

Playing career

Murphy first played Gaelic football at juvenile and underage levels with the Dr. Crokes club in Killarney. He won a Kerry U21FC title in 1986. By that stage Murphy had also joined the club's top adult team, having won a Kerry IFC title in 1985. He later won two Munster SCFC titles and was man of the match when Dr. Crokes beat Thomas Davis in the 1992 All-Ireland club final. Murphy's club career ended shortly after winning a second Kerry SFC medal in 2000.

Murphy first appeared on the inter-county scene for Kerry as a member of the minor team in 1983. He later spent a year with the under-21 team, however, his underage career ended without success. Murphy made his senior team debut during the 1987–88 league, however, his career coincided with a relatively fallow period in terms of success. In spite of this, he was selected on the All-Star team in 1989 and won a Munster SFC medal in 1991.

Management career

Murphy was appointed manager of the Kerry junior football team in 2002. His two-year tenure in charge saw the team win consecutive Munster JFC titles, however, Kerry lost the 2002 All-Ireland junior final to Wicklow.

Honours

Player

Dr Crokes
All-Ireland Senior Club Football Championship: 1992
Munster Senior Club Football Championship: 1990, 1991
Kerry Senior Football Championship: 1991, 2000
Kerry Senior Club Football Championship: 1987, 1990, 1992, 1993, 1996
East Kerry Senior Football Championship: 1986, 1990, 1991, 1992, 1993, 1995, 2000
Kerry Intermediate Football Championship: 1985
Kerry Under-21 Football Championship: 1986

Kerry
Munster Senior Football Championship: 1991

Management

Kerry
Munster Junior Football Championship: 2002, 2003

References

1965 births
Living people
Dr Crokes Gaelic footballers
Kerry inter-county Gaelic footballers
Munster inter-provincial Gaelic footballers
Gaelic football managers
Garda Síochána officers